Liquid Graveyard is a progressive death metal band founded by John Walker, the frontman of Cancer.

Biography 
Liquid Graveyard is a death metal band formed in 2006 by John Walker, frontman and guitarist in the British death metal band Cancer, Adrian de Buitléar, ex-bassist from Mourning Beloveth, an Irish band, and vocalist Raquel Walker.

Most recently, the band recruited musicians Shane Embury (Napalm Death, Lock Up, Brujeria) and Nick Barker (Lock Up, Dimmu Borgir, Cradle Of Filth) to record their third album, By Nature So Perverse, released in 2016 on Sleaszy Rider Records.

Members 
 Raquel Walker - vocals
 John Walker - guitars 
Additional members:
Nick Barker - drums
Shane Embury - bass
Session members:
 Daniel Maganto - bass

Discography 
 Criministers (2008) (demo)
 On Evil Days (2009) (My Kingdom Music )
 Ecstasy (2010) (compilation album - My Kingdom Music )
 The Fifth Time I Died (2011) (Rising Records)
 By Nature So Perverse (2016) (Sleaszy Rider)

References

External links 

British death metal musical groups
Musical groups established in 2006
Heavy metal supergroups